The Williams FW36 is a Formula One racing car designed by Williams Grand Prix Engineering to compete in the 2014 Formula One season. It was driven by Valtteri Bottas and Felipe Massa, who replaced the departing Pastor Maldonado.

Background and design 
The FW36 was the first car built by Williams to use a Mercedes engine, a 1.6-litre V6 turbocharged unit, known as the PU106A Hybrid.

A computer-generated rendering of the car was released on 23 January, showing an extended nosecone dubbed the "anteater". The team competed under the name "Williams Martini Racing" after securing title sponsorship from the Martini & Rossi distillery, making the FW36 the first Formula One car to compete in Martini Racing colours since 1979.

The FW36 was the first turbo powered Formula One car designed and raced by Williams since the Honda powered FW11B which carried Nelson Piquet and Nigel Mansell to first and second places respectively in the  World Championship.

Competition history
The car immediately proved to be more competitive than its predecessor, consistently setting the quickest times in preseason testing. It was particularly fast in a straight line, thanks in part to the Mercedes power unit and in part to its low-drag design. At the first race in Australia, the car proved to be unstable in mixed conditions, but both drivers made it into Q3. In the race, Massa was taken out at the first turn but Bottas finished sixth – later promoted to fifth – despite a grid penalty and clipping the wall and cutting a tyre ten laps in.

Following a string of bad luck (particularly affecting Massa), the cars became more competitive after Canada, and especially in Austria, where they took a surprise 1–2 in qualifying with Massa on pole. This upturn in performance continued with Bottas finishing third in Austria, Belgium and Russia and second in Great Britain and Germany, Massa taking third in Italy and Brazil and both drivers scoring Williams's first double podium since the 2005 Monaco Grand Prix in Abu Dhabi. The team scored 320 constructors' points in 2014, compared to 5 in 2013, this secured them 3rd in the Constructors' Championship, 104 points ahead of Ferrari. The car was arguably the second fastest on the grid towards the end of the season as shown by the 2-3 in Abu Dhabi by Massa and Bottas respectively.

Aftermath 
In September 2020, before the start of the 2020 Italian Grand Prix, Claire Williams was given a signed front wing from the car as a souvenir from her Williams colleagues. The front wing was signed by everyone who worked at Williams.

Complete Formula One results
(key) (results in bold indicate pole position; results in italics indicate fastest lap)

† — Driver failed to finish the race, but was classified as they had completed greater than 90% of the race distance.

References

Williams FW36
2014 Formula One season cars